Toma Mirza is a Bangladeshi film actress. She won Bangladesh National Film Award for Best Supporting Actress for the film Nodijon (2015).

Education and career
Mirza studied LLB honors at Manarat International University.

As of 2017, Mirza acted in 13 films.

Personal life
Mirza first married Hisham Chishti. They were divorced in 2021.

Films
 Bolo Na Tumi Amar (2010)
 Ekbar Bolo Bhalobashi (2011)
 Chotto Songsar (2011)
 O Amar Desher Mati (2012)
 Ek Mon Ek Pran (2012)
 Mon Bojhena (2012)
 Manik Ratan Dui Bhai (2012)
 Eve Teasing (2013)
 Tomar Majhe Ami (2013)
 Tomar Kache Rini (2014)
 Palabar Path Nei
 Nodijon (2015)
 Game Returns (2017)
 Ohongkar (2017)
 Grash (2017)
 Chol Palay (2017)
 Gohiner Gaan (2019)
 The Dark Side of Dhaka (2021)
 Khachar Bhitor Ochin Pakhi (2021)
 Floor Number 7 (2022)
 Mission America
 From Bangladesh
 Surongo(Upcoming)
 Friday (2023)

Web Works

Awards
 ICT Channel i Digital Media Award - Best Actress for Khachar Bhitor Ochin Pakhi

References

External links
 

Living people
Bangladeshi film actresses
Best Supporting Actress National Film Award (Bangladesh) winners
Year of birth missing (living people)
Place of birth missing (living people)